"Wrong" is the second single from American Idol finalist, Kimberley Locke, from her One Love album. The song was written by Kaci and Tiffany Arbuckle Lee. A dance remix by the remix team Bronleewe & Bose was later released on the iTunes digital single release.

Track listings and formats
US promotional single - CURBD-1871
 "Wrong" (Radio Mix) – 3:07
 "Wrong" (Radio Mix with lead guitar) – 3:07
 "Wrong" (Plumb Radio Mix) – 3:10

US digital single - "Wrong" (Remixes)
 "Wrong" (Radio Mix) – 3:07
 "Wrong" (Radio Mix with lead guitar) – 3:07
 "Wrong" (Bronleewe & Bose Radio Edit) – 2:42

Cover versions
Canadian pop singer Mandy Savoy released a version of "Wrong" in December 2007. The release featured remixes by dance producers Troy Morehouse and Gary Flanagan.

Charts

Music video
The video for "Wrong" was directed by Urban Strom, who has also directed videos for Mary J. Blige, Rachel Stevens and LeAnn Rimes. The video was filmed in London, England in the spring of 2004.

External links
"Wrong" Music Video

2004 singles
Kimberley Locke songs
Songs written by Plumb (singer)
2004 songs
Curb Records singles